Women's football in the Netherlands has traditionally had a low profile and female players had to play abroad.

History
Women first started trying playing football in the 1890s but were banned by the KNVB. In 1896 Sparta Rotterdam tried to form a women's football team but were thwarted. In the 1950s the Dutch Ladies Football Association was formed in 1955 and even created a women's football league but was banned by the KNVB. Women's football was played regionally in the Netherlands until the 1970s when UEFA declared all UEFA members must invest in women's football.

National team

On 17 April 1971, the French team played the first women's international football match recognized by FIFA against the Netherlands. The match took place in Hazebrouck, France and resulted in a 4–0 defeat for the Netherlands with Jocelyne Ratignier scoring a hattrick. 

The Netherlands has not had a strong tradition in women's international football; they did not qualify for the UEFA Women's Championship until 2009, and did not qualify for their first Women's World Cup until 2015 (the latter occasion being the first Women's World Cup with 24 teams instead of 16). In 2017 the national team won their first prize UEFA Women's Euro 2017. 4 out of 5 Dutch television viewers watched the Netherlands win the championship. 2 years later, in only their second World Cup, the Dutch made it all the way into the final which they lost to the US 0–2.

Domestic League

In 2012, the KNVB and its Belgian counterpart, the KBVB/URBSFA, created a new top league for both countries, the BeNe League. From the Dutch perspective, the move was intended to improve the Netherlands women's national football team. However, the two federations scrapped the BeNe League after the 2014–15 season, with the KNVB choosing to reactivate the women's Eredivisie with the same seven clubs that had formed the Dutch contingent in the final season of the joint league. The Eredivisie has since expanded to nine teams. UEFA Women's Euro 2017 was hosted in the Netherlands.

See also
Football in the Netherlands

References